Gernot Jurtin (9 October 1955 – 5 December 2006) was an Austrian football player, and a legend amongst Sturm Graz fans.

Club career 
Jurtin joined Sturm Graz in the summer of 1974 under coach Karl Schlechta and immediately forced his way into the starting eleven. One of his finest seasons came in 1980/81 when he scored 20 goals in the Bundesliga including five in a 7–0 win against Wiener Sportclub on 5 June 1981. He formed a prolific strike partnership with Bozo Bakota. By the time Jurtin left Sturm Graz in 1987, he had made 373 appearances for them, scoring 119 league goals. The blond-haired number 11 was the first Graz player to break the 100-goal barrier in the league.

International career 
Between 1979 and 1983, he won 12 caps for Austria, scoring one goal. He made two appearances for them in the 1982 FIFA World Cup, against Chile and Northern Ireland.

Death 
On 5 December 2006, he died of cancer at the age of 51.

Honours 
Austrian Bundesliga Top Goalscorer (1):
 1981

External links

References 

1955 births
2006 deaths
People from Murau District
Austrian footballers
Austria international footballers
1982 FIFA World Cup players
SK Sturm Graz players
Austrian Football Bundesliga players
Deaths from cancer in Austria
Association football forwards
Footballers from Styria